The European Liver Patients' Association (ELPA) is an international non-governmental organisation best known for its role in patient advocacy concerning liver diseases. ELPA is an umbrella organisation representing more than 30 members stemming from 25 European and non-European countries.

History 
ELPA was created in June 2004, when 13 liver patient groups from 10 European and Mediterranean countries met to create the association. ELPA was formally launched in Paris on 14 April 2005 during the annual conference of the European Association for the Study of the Liver (EASL).

Nowadays, ELPA represents more than 30 liver patients' organisations from 25 different countries (Belgium, Bosnia and Herzegovina, Cyprus, Croatia, Denmark, Egypt, Finland, France, Georgia, Ireland, Israel, North Macedonia, Norway, Poland, Portugal, Romania, Russia, Serbia, Slovakia, Slovenia, Spain, Sweden, Turkey, United Kingdom).

Objectives 
ELPA aims to promote the interests of people with liver disease and, in particular:

Structure 
ELPA vision and activities are coordinated and supervised by an elected president, and a Governing Board made up of Directors who belong to an organisation that is a full member of the association.

One of the Directors is also the Treasurer of the Association. As ELPA deals with many medical and scientific contents, a Scientific Committee formed by Medical Doctors and researchers has been appointed. The Secretariat in Brussels runs all day-by-day activities in the heart of the EU capital.

ELPA is an official Non-Profit Organisation with international goals based in Brussels, governed by Belgian law for NonProfit Organisation (ASBL). Official roles and procedures of the association were published on the Moniteur Belge in 2005.

To better communicate with its supporters and stakeholders, ELPA has obtained the ISO 9001:2015 quality standard in 2021, making it the first patients' association in Europe with a quality management system

ELPA is a member of the European Patient Forum since 2011.

Activities

Policy and Advocacy 
As an umbrella patients' association, ELPA acts as an intermediary between all the involved stakeholders - the national patients' communities, the industry, and the EU policymakers. It provides a different perspective based on the fact that ELPA, through its members, has immediate and direct access to the patients' lives and the best practices in a national and regional context.

As one voice, ELPA works to promote the development and implementation of policies, strategies, and healthcare services that empower patients to engage in decision-making. To this end, ELPA is part of different international organisations.

Participation in Medical Research Projects 
ELPA is currently involved in 10 ongoing medical research projects. 8 are funded by the European Commission through the Horizon 2020 program, 1 by the European Institute of Innovation and Technology (EIT).

ELPA Main Outcomes 

 2012 - Launch of the Euro Hepatitis Care Index.
 2015 - Launch of the Call to Action Report Time to DeLiver: Getting a Grip on Hepatic Encephalopathy.
 2016 - Publishing of the Hep-Core Report - Monitoring the implementation of hepatitis B and C policy recommendations in Europe.
 2016 - Release of the documentary Hep C – From Hell To Hope to educate and generate awareness about progress and remaining challenges towards achieving HCV elimination, in collaboration with Hetz - Israeli Association For The Health Of the Liver, World Hepatitis Alliance, directed by Ricard Mamblona and produced by Prodiggi Films.
 2019 - Launch of the White Paper on Hepatic Encephalopathy.
 2020 - Feedback on Europe's Beating Cancer Plan.
 2021 - Launch of the Call to Action on Fatty Liver.
 2021 - Launch of the White Paper on Liver Cancer jointly with Digestive Cancers Europe.

References

External links 

 www.elpa.eu

Organizations based in Paris
Medical associations based in France
Patients' organizations
2004 establishments in France
Organizations established in 2004
Liver